Benaroya Hall is the home of the Seattle Symphony in Downtown Seattle, Washington, United States. It features two auditoria, the S. Mark Taper Foundation Auditorium, a 2500-seat performance venue, as well as the Illsley Ball Nordstrom Recital Hall, which seats 536. Opened in September 1998 at a cost of $120 million, Benaroya is noted for its technology-infused acoustics designed by Cyril Harris. Benaroya occupies an entire city block in the center of the city and has helped double the Seattle Symphony's budget and number of performances. The lobby of the hall features a large contribution of glass art, such as one given the title Crystal Cascade, by world-renowned artist Dale Chihuly.

Benaroya Hall is named for noted philanthropist Jack Benaroya, whose $15.8 million donation was the first and largest of many for construction of the facility.

The hall was designed by LMN Architects of Seattle, and was awarded the National Honor Award from the American Institute of Architects in 2001. The structural engineer on the project was Magnusson Klemencic Associates.

The building sits directly above the Great Northern Tunnel, which carries the primary rail corridor through the city, and adjacent to the Downtown Seattle Transit Tunnel, which has a station directly integrated into the building. The performance hall is insulated by floating on rubber pads which insulate it from the outer shell of the building. These same noise-insulation features would also serve to dampen the destructive effects of any prospective earthquakes.

See also 
 List of concert halls

References

External links

 Benaroya Hall official website

Buildings and structures in Seattle
Culture of Seattle
Performing arts centers in Washington (state)
Tourist attractions in Seattle
Downtown Seattle